Scolytus schevyrewi, the banded elm bark beetle, is a 3–4 mm long elm bark beetle species in the genus Scolytus native from Asia and accidentally introduced to North America. It is a vector of the Dutch elm disease, caused by the Ascomycota Ophiostoma ulmi and Ophiostoma novo-ulmi. In North America, it is displacing both the native elm bark beetle and the previously introduced smaller European elm bark beetle, which are becoming less common in their range with the expansion of S. schevyrewi.

References 

Scolytinae
Insect pests of temperate forests
Beetles described in 1802
Taxa named by Andrey Semyonov-Tyan-Shansky